The Pacific Institute of Geography of the Far Eastern Branch of the Russian Academy of Sciences (Russian:Тихоокеанский институт географии Дальневосточного отделения Российской академии наук)(abbr. TIG FEB RAS) is a research institute of the Far Eastern Branch of the Russian Academy of Sciences, organized in 1971. It is the leading scientific institution of geographic profile in the Russian Far East. It is located in Vladivostok.

History
The Pacific Institute of Geography was established on October 1, 1971 at the Far Eastern Scientific Center of the USSR Academy of Sciences. Andrey Kapitsa, A prominent scientist, geographer, and corresponding member of the USSR Academy of Sciences became the director-organizer of the institute. The main task of the new institute was to organize, conduct, and coordinate full-scale geographic studies of the Far East regions and natural geosystems in the continent-ocean transition zone.

In May 2002, the Kamchatka Institute of Ecology and Nature Management was attached to the Pacific Institute of Geography, which later became the Kamchatka branch of the TIG FEB RAS.

In 2018, according to the results of the FANO assessment of the performance of scientific organizations, the institute was assigned category I in the profile "Knowledge generation"

In 2020, the institute established the scientific journal "Pacific Geography".

Scientific departments
Laboratory of Paleogeography and Geomorphology (Head - L.A. Ganzei, Ph.D.)
Laboratory of Geochemistry (Head - Doctor of Geological Sciences V.M.Shulkin)
Laboratory of Biogeography and Ecology (Head - Doctor of Biological Sciences S.V. Osipov )
Laboratory for the use of natural resources in coastal regions (head - V.V. Zharikov, Ph.D.)
Laboratory of Geoinformation Technologies and Geosystems Modeling (Head - Ph.D. S. M. Krasnopeyev)
Laboratory of Social and Medical Geography (Head - S. A. Lozovskaya, Candidate of Biological Sciences)
Laboratory of Territorial and Economic Structures (Head - Dr. A.V. Moshkov )
Laboratory of Ecology and Animal Protection (Head - I.V. Seredkin, Candidate of Biological Sciences)
Laboratory of Hydrology and Climatology (headed by V.V. Shamov, Doctor of Geology )
Laboratory of transformations of contact geosystems (head - Ph.D. A.N.Bugaets)
Information and Cartographic Center (Head - Ph.D. E. G. Egidarev)
Center for Landscape and Ecological Research (head - A. N. Kachur, Candidate of Geology )
Regional Center for Environmental Monitoring of the North-West Pacific (coordinated by Dr. A. N. Kachur )
Kamchatka Branch of TIG FEB RAS (Director - Doctor of Biological Sciences A.M. Tokranov )
North-Eastern scientific base of TIG FEB RAS in the village. Cherskiy (supervisor - S. A. Zimov )
vScientific and experimental base "Smychka"
Scientific base in the village of Khrustalny (is in conservation)

Earlier in the structure of the institute there were separate laboratories: paleogeography; geomorphology; seascapes; permafrost science; sustainable nature management and expertise; ecological and geographical expertise; medical geography; regional settlement problems; geocybernetics, etc.

The institute has postgraduate studies in five profiles of geosciences. In 2016–2019, the dissertation council worked in the specialty "Geoecology".

Main scientific directions

The main research areas of the Institute:
The study of structure and dynamics of geographic systems in the transition zone (land-ocean) and their modeling;
Researching the development and optimization of regional types of nature management, including coastal-marine, based on geoinformation technologies, development of regional programs for sustainable nature management;
Studying the dynamics and interrelationships of territorial natural resource systems and territorial structures of the economy and settlement, development of programs for sustainable development of the Far Eastern regions of Russia, taking into account the integration processes in the Asia-Pacific region.

Institute staff
In total, the institute employs 213 people, including 108 researchers, including:

Academician of RAS - 1
Doctors of Science - 14
Candidates of Science - 63

Institute directors
1st Director (1971-1979) - A.P. Kapitsa, Corresponding Member of the Russian Academy of Sciences, geographer and geomorphologist
2nd Director (1979-1991) - G. I. Khudyakov, Corresponding Member of the Russian Academy of Sciences, physical geographer, geomorphologist and geologist
3rd Director (1991-2016) - P. Ya. Baklanov, Academician of the Russian Academy of Sciences, economic geographer
4th Director (2016—2019) - V. V. Ermoshin, Ph.D. in Geography, cartographer
5th director (since 2019) - K. S. Ganzei, candidate of geographical sciences, geographer

Institute scientists
Over the years, famous geographers worked at the institute:

K. K. Markov, Academician of the USSR Academy of Sciences
A. P. Kapitsa, Corresponding Member of the Russian Academy of Sciences, Organizing Director of the institute (1971-1979)
G. I. Khudyakov, Corresponding Member of the Russian Academy of Sciences
V. Ya. Sergin, Doctor of Science
B. I. Vtyurin, Doctor of Science
V. V. Nikolskaya, Doctor of Science
S. Ya. Sergin, Doctor of Science
Yu. G. Puzachenko, Doctor of Science
Sh.Sh. Hasanov, Doctor of Science
E. G. Kolomyts, Doctor of Science
B. V. Poyarkov, Doctor of Science
S. S. Ganzei, Doctor of Science
B. V. Preobrazhensky, Doctor of Science
E. I. Bolotin, Doctor of Science
V.P.Seledets, Doctor of Science
V. I. Chuprynin, Doctor of Science
D. G. Pikunov, Doctor of Science
A.P. Kulakov, Doctor of Science
M. T. Romanov, Doctor of Science
A. Stepanko, Candidate of Science, Scientific Secretary of the institute (1996-2017)

Directorate
Scientific adviser: Baklanov Pyotr Yakovlevich - Academician of the Russian Academy of Sciences, Professor
Director: Ganzei Kirill Sergeevich, Candidate of Geographical Sciences
Deputy Director for Research: Zharikov Vasily Valerievich, Candidate of Geographical Sciences
Scientific secretary: Lyaschevskaya Marina Sergeevna, candidate of geographical sciences

References

Russian Academy of Sciences
Research institutes in the Soviet Union
1971 establishments in the Soviet Union
Research institutes established in 1971